"My Brother's Keeper" is part of the Tyndale translation of the story of Cain and Abel.

My Brother's Keeper may also refer to:

Literature
 My Brother's Keeper (Davenport novel), by Marcia Davenport
 My Brother's Keeper (Sheffield novel), by Charles Sheffield
 My Brother's Keeper, a 2005 novel by Patricia McCormick
 My Brother's Keeper, a book by Bo Gritz
 My Brother's Keeper, a book by Stanislaus Joyce, brother of James Joyce
 My Brother's Keeper, a series of Star Trek books by Michael Jan Friedman
 My Brother's Keeper, a comic book published by Spire Christian Comics
 My Brother's Keeper: A History of the American Jewish Joint Distribution Committee 1929–1939, a book by Yehuda Bauer
 My Brother's Keeper: A Memoir and a Message, a book by Amitai Etzioni
 My Brother's Keeper, a play by Nigel Williams

Film and television

Film
 My Brother's Keeper (film), a 1948 British film starring Jack Warner
 My Brother's Keeper, a 1995 TV film featuring Ellen Burstyn
 My Brother's Keeper (Le Sang du frère), a 2004 film starring Christian Potenza
 My Brother's Keeper, a 2020 short film about the reunion of Guantanamo prisoner Mohamedou Ould Slahi and his former guard Steve Wood

Television
 My Brother's Keeper (TV series), a 1975–1976 British sitcom
 "My Brother's Keeper" (Sliders), a 1999 episode of Sliders
 "My Brother's Keeper" (Danny Phantom episode), an episode of Danny Phantom
 "My Brother's Keeper" (The Vampire Diaries), a 2012 episode of The Vampire Diaries
 "My Brother's Keeper", an episode of Bonanza
 "My Brother's Keeper", an episode of ER
 "My Brother's Keeper", an episode of Everwood
 "My Brother's Keeper", an episode of The Fresh Prince of Bel-Air
 "My Brother's Keeper", an episode of G.I. Joe: A Real American Hero
 "My Brother's Keeper", an episode of Gunsmoke
 "My Brother's Keeper", an episode of Lucifer
 "My Brother's Keeper", an episode of NCIS: New Orleans
 "My Brother's Keeper", an episode of Tales from the Crypt

Music
 My Brother's Keeper (Long Live G), an EP by DaBaby, 2020
 My Brother's Keeper (K-Ci and JoJo album), 2013
 My Brother's Keeper (Lake album), 2006
 My Brother's Keeper (OuterSpace album), 2011
 "My Brother's Keeper", a song by Ying Yang Twins from U.S.A. (United State of Atlanta), 2005

Politics
 My Brother's Keeper Challenge

See also
 Am I My Brother's Keeper, an album by Kane & Abel, 1998
 Brother's keeper (disambiguation)
 Her Brother's Keeper (disambiguation)
 His Brother's Keeper (disambiguation)
 My Sister's Keeper (disambiguation)